Cloghduv or Cloghduff is a village in County Cork, Ireland. It has a population of 360 people. The main industry is agriculture, although it is also a commuter village for Cork City. Cloughduv is part of the Dáil constituency of Cork North-West. The village is 1.4 km from the River Bride.

Amenities
The village of Cloughduv consists of a pub, a shop, a church and a number of housing estates. The former Cloughduv Creamery closed in 2018 after 126 years in business. Cloughduv is served by St. Joseph's Catholic Church.

Cloughduv GAA is the local Gaelic Athletic Association club.

See also
 List of towns and villages in Ireland

References

External links
Cloughduv Hurling Club

Towns and villages in County Cork
Articles on towns and villages in Ireland possibly missing Irish place names